Marisa Tomei is an American actress who has received various awards and nominations throughout her career.

Tomei had her breakthrough role playing Mona Lisa Vito in the 1992 comedy film My Cousin Vinny, for which she won the Academy Award for Best Supporting Actress. For the drama film Unhook the Stars (1996), she received her first Screen Actors Guild Award nomination for Outstanding Performance by a Female Actor in a Supporting Role. She continued playing supporting roles in comedies such has Slums of Beverly Hills (1998) and What Women Want (2000), receiving nominations for the Teen Choice Awards and the Satellite Awards among others. In 2001, she appeared in Todd Field's In the Bedroom, earning her second Academy Award nomination for Best Supporting Actress and nods for a Critics' Choice Movie Award, a Golden Globe Award and a Screen Actors Guild Award. In 2008, Tomei played Cassidy/Pam, a struggling stripper, in the Darren Aronofsky film The Wrestler. Numerous critics heralded this performance as a standout in her career, and she was subsequently nominated for her third Academy Award for Best Supporting Actress, her first BAFTA Award for Best Actress in a Supporting Role and her second Golden Globe Award for Best Supporting Actress. From 2016 to 2021, Tomei portrayed Aunt May in the Marvel Cinematic Universe, receiving a nomination for the Saturn Award for Best Supporting Actress for Spider-Man: No Way Home (2021).

For work in the theater, Tomei has won a Drama Desk Award and a Theatre World Award and was nominated for a Drama League Award, while for her television work she has earned nominations for a Critics' Choice Television Award, a Daytime Emmy Award, and won a Gracie Award for her recurring role in the comedy-drama television series Rescue Me (2006).

Awards and nominations

Notes

References

External links 
  

Tomei, Marisa